Natalie Plane (born 4 August 1996) is an Australian rules footballer playing for the St Kilda Football Club in the AFL Women's competition (AFLW). She was drafted by Carlton with the club's eleventh selection and the eighty third overall in the 2016 AFL Women's draft. She made her debut in Round 1, 2017, in the club and the league's inaugural match at Ikon Park against . She suffered a season-ending ankle injury in the match however, and would not return to AFLW football that year.

Plane also plays cricket, representing Melbourne Renegades in the Women's Big Bash League in the 2016–17 season.

In March 2023, Plane was traded to St Kilda.

References

External links

Living people
1996 births
Carlton Football Club (AFLW) players
Australian rules footballers from Victoria (Australia)
Sportswomen from Victoria (Australia)
Indigenous Australian players of Australian rules football
Victorian Women's Football League players
Melbourne Renegades (WBBL) cricketers